Gujarat Solar Park-1 (also called Charanka Solar Park) is solar power plant near Charanka village in Patan district of Gujarat, India. It has installed generation capacity of about 600 MW, as 2018. More 190 MW are under installation.

Timeline
Inaugurated in 2012 by the then Chief Minister of Gujarat Narendra Modi, it was home to about 250 MW capacity initially. On 19 April 2012, a total of  had been commissioned. It also became the world's third largest photo voltaic power station.

345 MW had been installed by March 2016.

The Gujarat Power Corporation Limited (GPCL), the project's primary developer, said in April, 2018 that further capacity addition of 150 MW taking the total to 790 MW may be opted for soon given the availability of land in the Park.

So far, the park has witnessed investments of Rs 5,365 crore and generated 3,441 million units till date.

Installed generation capacity is at about 615 MW at present, having been commissioned by 31 developers in the Solar Park. GACL (Gujarat Alkalies and Chemicals Limited) is setting up 30 MW Solar PV plant, and GNFC (Gujarat Narmada Valley Fertilizers and Chemicals) is in the process of setting up 10 MW project.

Projects of 95MW are under construction and 30MW under planning as of December, 2018.

Power purchase agreement
Rs 15 (about US$0.29) per kWh for the first 12 years and Rs 5 (about US$0.10) per kWh from the 13th to 25th year. The national solar policy has fixed tariffs of Rs17 for photovoltaic and Rs15 for solar thermal for 25 years.

About 600 MW were completed prior to the deadline of 28 January 2012 to receive the above tariff. Systems completed after that date are subject to a lower tariff.

Criticism 
The solar park has been setup on the traditional migration routes of a semi-nomadic shepherd people. The government had not consulted them.

References

External links
 GPCL Official website

Patan district
Solar power stations in Gujarat
Energy infrastructure completed in 2012
2012 establishments in Gujarat